Master of War, Warmaster, or variations thereof may refer to:

Music
 Warmaster (band), a Dutch deathmetal band

Albums
 Masters of War (album), a 2007 album by Mountain
 War Master (1991 album), a death metal album by Bolt Thrower

Songs
 "Masters of War", a 1963 song by Bob Dylan
 "War Master", a song death metal song by Bolt Thrower off the 1991 album War Master
 "Warmaster", a song black metal song by Susperia off the 2002 album Vindication (Susperia album)

Other uses
 Warlord, a master through the means of war
 Warmaster, a tabletop wargame
 The War Master (audio drama series), a 2017 Doctor Who audio play
 Master of War, a series of military-action novels by David Gilman
 Warmaster, a DC Comics supervillain enemy of Wonder Woman
 The Warmaster, ringname of mixed martial artist Josh Barnett
 The Warmaster, a 2017 novel by Dan Abnett, part of the novel series Gaunt's Ghosts

See also

 War (disambiguation)
 Master (disambiguation)
 Warlord (disambiguation)
 War chief (disambiguation)